The 2002 All-Ireland Under-21 Hurling Championship was the 39th staging of the All-Ireland championship since its establishment in 1964. The championship began 7 June and ended on 15 September 2002.

Limerick were the defending champions and retained their title for a third successive year after defeating Galway by 3-17 to 0-8 in the final.

Teams

Team summaries

Results

Leinster Under-21 Hurling Championship

Quarter-finals

Semi-finals

Final

Munster Under-21 Hurling Championship

Quarter-finals

Semi-finals

Finals

Ulster Under-21 Hurling Championship

Semi-final

Final

All-Ireland Under-21 Hurling Championship

Semi-finals

Final

Championship statistics

Top scorers

Top scorers overall

Top scorers in a single game

Miscellaneous

 Limerick become the first team since Tipperary in 1981 to win three successive All-Ireland titles.

References

Under-21
All-Ireland Under-21 Hurling Championship